In commercial real estate, recoverable expenses are those expenses of running a property that are billed back to the tenants as a form of additional rent. A simple example is the electricity bill for a large complex that is then divided up among the tenants. Water, natural gas, cleaning and other operating expenses are often considered recoverable, as well as some periodic capital expenses. Not all expenses are recoverable, those that directly benefit only the landlord are generally not included. For instance, spending on advertising to attract new tenants does not directly benefit existing tenants, and thus is not generally included as a recoverable item.

The calculation of a given tenant's share of an expense can be complex. A general system is to divide it up by the tenant's rented area compared to the total available rentable area in the building. This is often used for items that are truly shared, like the gas used to heat the building, or the electricity used to run the lighting and air conditioning. In contrast, cleaning costs vary widely; the cost of cleaning a food court is much higher than sweeping and cleaning the common areas like walkways. These expenses can be separated and charged against a suitable area, like the area of the food court.

In some examples, a base amount of a given expense may be considered the landlord's responsibility, while any additional amount is shared out. This is commonly seen in items like property taxes and management fees. In this case the landlord might agree to pay the first, say, $5,000 of the property taxes, and then charge anything above that back to the tenants. This is known as a recovery stop, or simply a stop.

Some expenses vary from year to year for any variety of reasons. For instance, the cost of snow removal varies greatly on the weather. Others vary because they are multi-year expenses, like the repaving of the parking lot, which might only occur every ten years. To smooth out fluctuations in payments, leases may include a ceiling or floor, the maximum or minimum payments in any given period. Additionally, there may be a cap on payments that limits any period-to-period change, pushing back any overage to future periods, potentially forever. This is generally used to protect tenants from large one-off expenses like a roof collapse, the total expense of which may be more than can be borne even by all of the tenants together.

To ease the calculations in cases where there may be hundreds of individual line items, it is common to group similar expenses into an expense group, in which case the recovery calculation can be carried out against the total instead of each item. A common example of this is the common area maintenance charges, or CAM, which includes cleaning and day-to-day expenses like changing lights. In US leases, it is common to group together CAM, property tax and insurance, in which case it is known as a "net-net-net" lease, or NNN lease, pronounced "triple-N".

Another complication involved in recoverable expense calculations occurs due to changes in occupancy. If an item was being shared equally among tenants based on their area relative to the total building area, when an area is unoccupied that means the remaining tenant's combined payments will no longer cover the entire expense. In some cases this is reasonable; the tenants would not be expected to pay more property taxes if the landlord does not rent out all the units. However, in the case where expenses are ultimately a function of the leased area, like electricity bill where one would expect the amount to vary based on the number of tenants actually using power, the calculation may be grossed up by dividing the tenant's area by the occupied building area, not the total area.

References
 
 

Commercial real estate